The Grampians is grade II listed apartment building in Shepherds Bush Road, Shepherd's Bush, London. It was designed by Maurice Webb in the Art Deco style and built between 1935 and 1937. The designs for the block were exhibited at the Royal Academy in 1935.

References

Further reading
The Builder, May 10, 1935, pp. 878 & 882.
The Builder, January 8, 1939, pp. 92–95 & 121.

External links 

Grade II listed buildings in the London Borough of Hammersmith and Fulham
Shepherd's Bush
Art Deco architecture in London
Buildings and structures completed in 1937